Harpalus indianus is a species of ground beetle in the subfamily Harpalinae. It was described by Csiki in 1932.

References

indianus
Beetles described in 1932